The first name Darlene is derived from the Old English darel-ene, meaning "little dear one".

Notable people
Darlene (formerly known as Darlene Pekul), American artist and calligrapher
Darlene Conley, American actress
Darlene de Souza, Brazilian footballer
Darlene Fairley, American politician
Darlene Gillespie, Canadian-American actress
Darlene Garner, American minister and activist
Darlene Hard, American tennis player
Darlene Hooley, American politician
Darlene Love, American singer and actress
Darlene Naponse, Canadian Anishinaabe filmmaker, writer, director, and community activist
Darlene Ka-Mook Nichols, Native American activist and FBI informant
Darlene Pagano, American lesbian feminist activist
Darlene Quaife, Canadian novelist
Darlene Rodriguez, American journalist
Darlene Vogel, American actress and model
Darlene Zschech, Australian religious leader and musician

In fiction 
 Darlene Connor is a fictional character from the television sitcom Roseanne
 Darlene is one of the characters in the play and film Hurlyburly
 Darlene Spritzer is a fictional waitress from the DC Comics Lobo comic books
 Darlene Taylor is a fictional character from the soap opera Hollyoaks
 Darlene Alderson is one of the characters from the television series Mr. Robot

English given names
Feminine given names
English feminine given names